Javierregay is a locality located in the municipality of Puente la Reina de Jaca, in Huesca province, Aragon, Spain. As of 2020, it has a population of 89.

Geography 
Javierregay is located 93km north-northwest of Huesca.

References

Populated places in the Province of Huesca